Thymus hyemalis, the winter thyme, is a species of flowering plant in the family Lamiaceae, endemic to southeast Spain. Its volatile oil constituents vary seasonally.

Subtaxa
The following subtaxa are accepted:
Thymus hyemalis subsp. hyemalis
Thymus hyemalis subsp. millefloris  – Almería

References

hyemalis
Endemic flora of Spain
Plants described in 1864